(born September 17, 1979), known professionally as ,  is a Japanese male actor and vlogger. He is best known for originating the role of Sadaharu Inui of the first generation Seigaku cast of the Prince of Tennis musical series (commonly called Tenimyu), and also played the role of Kaito Toma, the human host of Ultraman Max in the 2005 Ultraman Max series.

Aoyama reprised his role as Inui and reunited with the majority first Seigaku cast to perform in Tenimyus Dream Live 7th concert to celebrate the end of the series' first season.

Aside from his acting career, he also had a Youtube Channel for his outdoor and travel vlogs.

Aoyama appeared in the 1st anniversary of Ultraman Connection Live along with his Ultraman Max co-stars, Hitomi Hasebe, Sean Nichols, and series creators, Takeshi Yagi and Takashi Miike.

Stage rolesTenimyu: The Prince Of Tennis Musical Series (as Sadaharu Inui)'''
 The Prince of Tennis Musical (2003)
 The Prince of Tennis Musical: Remarkable 1st Match Fudomine (2003–2004)
 The Prince of Tennis Musical: Dream Live 1st (2004)
 The Prince of Tennis Musical: More Than Limit St. Rudolph Gakuen (2004)
 The Prince of Tennis Musical: Side Fudomine ~Special Match~ (In Winter of 2004-2005)
 The Prince of Tennis Musical: Dream Live 7th (2010)

Filmography

Film and televisionDamenari (2004) TV series, as TezukaHolyland (2005) Mini TV series, as Shinichi KanedaUltraman Max (2005) TV series, as Kaito TomaWatashi ga Watashi de Aru Tame ni (2006) as Tonomura KazukiDeath Note (2006) as Detective Tōuta MatsudaDeath Note: The Last Name (2006) as Detective Tōuta MatsudaKaiki Daisakusen - Second File (2007) Mini TV seriesNatsu Kumo Agare (2007) TV seriesThe Man who was Made a Fool by L the Most - Detective Matsuda's Case File (2008) as Detective Tōuta MatsudaSorasoi (2008) as TabeUltraman X (2015) TV series, as Kaito Toma and Ultraman MaxTaiyō no Futa (2016) as Manabu TerataDeath Note: New Generation (2016) as Detective Tōuta MatsudaDeath Note: Light Up the New World (2016) as Detective Tōuta Matsuda

Music videos
 Sota appeared in Kimeru's music video of "Timeless" alongside fellow Tenimyu cast members Eiji Takigawa and Naoya Gomoto.

Web seriesUltraman Connection Live'' (2022) as himself

References

External links 
 Sota Aoyama's yahoo group (English/Spanish version)
Sota Aoyama's official blog 
Sota Aoyama's official web site
Sota Aoyama Official Youtube Channel

Living people
Japanese male film actors
Japanese male stage actors
Japanese male television actors
1979 births
People from Shimane Prefecture
Actors from Shimane Prefecture